Loleatta is the debut studio album recorded by American singer Loleatta Holloway, released in 1973 on the Aware label.

History
The album features the singles "Mother of Shame", which peaked at #63 on the Hot Soul Singles chart, and "Our Love", which peaked at #43 on the Hot Soul Singles chart. Another single released, "Part Time Lover, Full Time Fool", failed to chart.

Track listing

Production
Floyd Smith – producer
Mike Terry – arranger
Ken Laxton – engineer
Wayne Neuendorf, Glenn Meadows, Milan Bogdan – remix engineers
James Flournoy Holmes, David "Worm" Holmes – album design & photography

Charts
Singles

References

External links 
 

1973 debut albums
Loleatta Holloway albums